Lampros Kefaloukos (born 31 March 1982) is a former professional footballer who played as a defender for several clubs in Greece, including stints with OFI Crete and Ergotelis F.C. in the Alpha Ethniki.

Career
Born in Heraklion, Kefaloukos began playing football with local side Irodotos Neas Alikarnassou. He went on loans to Gamma Ethniki side PAON Malia and Beta Ethniki side Ergotelis F.C. before leaving on a free transfer to sign with Ergotelis on a permanent basis in July 2006.

In September 2011, Kefaloukos signed a one-year contract to play for Episkopi F.C. in the Rethymno regional league.

References

External links
Profile at EPAE.org
Profile at Guardian Football
Profile at Onsports.gr

1982 births
Living people
OFI Crete F.C. players
Ergotelis F.C. players
Ionikos F.C. players
Rodos F.C. players
Footballers from Heraklion
Greek footballers
Association football defenders